Jiaomei is a Town in the portion of Longhai City north of the Jiulong River, in the municipal region of Zhangzhou, Fujian.

Presidential ties
Democracy icon Corazon Aquino and her son, Benigno S. Aquino III (the tenth and fifteenth Presidents of the Philippines, respectively) have Hongjian Village as their ancestral village. Both are members of the influential Chinese-Filipino Cojuangco clan, and thus are direct descendants of Hongjian native Co Yu Hwan (Christian name: José Cojuangco), who emigrated to Spanish Philippines in 1861. During their respective terms as president, both mother and son conducted state visits to the People's Republic of China, stopping by Hongjian to venerate their ancestors and reconnect with distant relatives.

Transport
The town lies along National Route 324, with which the Jiaomei-Haicang Road makes a T-junction downtown.

Administration
The town runs 32 Village committees:
 Banmei
 Ketang
 Shazhou
 Wuzhai
 Yujiang
 Liuzhuan
 Hengcang
 Puwei
 Yangcuo
 Caidian
 Shaban
 Shimei
 Nanmen
 Kengtou
 Xibian
 Dongshan
 Shicuo
 Shetou
 Xiashi
 Longtian
 Tianli
 Putou
 Longjiang
 Hongdai
 Fujing
 Shangfang
 Mianzhai
 Qiaotou
 Hongjian
 Jinshan
 Baijiao
 Dongmei

Notes and references

Zhangzhou